HDCA may refer to:

 Human Development and Capability Association
 Hyodesoxycholic acid
Honors Diploma in Computer Application